Jim Henson's Creature Shop Challenge is an American reality television game show on the Syfy cable network. It premiered on March 25, 2014 and ended on May 13, 2014.

Plot
A group of Creature Designers compete against each other to create puppets and animatronics such as those found in science fiction, comedy and kids' and family shows.

Actress Gigi Edgley from Jim Henson's Farscape serves as the show's host.

The judges will critique the creature designs that the contestants make where the featured puppeteers will perform the creatures on the Henson Sound Stage. The contestants wait in the screening room for the verdict and the least worthy contestant will be eliminated by Brian Henson. The winner gets prize money and a contract to work with Jim Henson's Creature Shop for a combined total of $100,000.

Judges
The judges for this show consist of:

 Brian Henson – The son of Jim Henson who is the chairman of The Jim Henson Company, a writer, a film director, and a puppeteer who had previously worked with The Muppets, was the lead puppeteer for Audrey II in Little Shop of Horrors and performed Hoggle in Labyrinth (1986)
 Beth Hathaway – A fabrication specialist who worked on Jurassic Park (1993), Edward Scissorhands (1990), Terminator 2: Judgment Day (1991), Inglourious Basterds (2009), The Walking Dead, Django Unchained (2012), and The Chronicles of Narnia: The Lion, the Witch and the Wardrobe (2005).
 Kirk Thatcher – A production designer who created creatures for Return of the Jedi (1983), E.T. the Extra-Terrestrial (1982), Star Trek II: The Wrath of Khan (1982), and Gremlins (1984). He has also done some designing of the characters from The Jim Henson Hour, CityKids, Dinosaurs, and Aliens in the Family.

Mentors
The show also features mentorship from the Creature Shop's staff ranging from:

 Peter Brooke – The Creature Shop Creative Supervisor who worked on Where the Wild Things Are, The Producers, Cats & Dogs, Dr. Dolittle, The Flintstones, That Puppet Game Show, Dinosaurs, The Storyteller, and Brats of the Lost Nebula.
 Julie Zobel – The Lead Fabricator who worked on Sesame Street, Fraggle Rock, Dinosaurs, Muppets Tonight, Sid the Science Kid, Where the Wild Things Are, George of the Jungle, Dr. Dolittle, Cats & Dogs, and Forgetting Sarah Marshall as well as concert constructions for Lady Gaga, Kanye West, and Deadmau5.
 John Criswell – The Mechanical Engineer who worked on Spaced Invaders, A Nightmare on Elm Street 4: The Dream Master, Critters, Dinosaurs, Star Kid, Adventures in Dinosaur City, Pushing Daisies, Sid the Science Kid, The Hangover, Where the Wild Things Are, George of the Jungle, and Cats & Dogs.

Contestants
Source

 Chaz Vance – Special-effects and entertainment designer from West Falls, New York. He was eliminated in episode one when the sea creature he and Robert created wasn't realistic enough and the head of the sea creature that Chaz made reminded Kirk Thatcher of H.R. Pufnstuf.
 Tina Roland – Freelance effects artist from Hollywood, California. She was eliminated in episode two because the arms she made for her group's Skeksis didn't have much action in them.
 Josh Smith – Creature costumer and prop builder from Minot, North Dakota. He forfeited the contest in episode three because it would be difficult to be with his family and work at Jim Henson's Creature Shop.
 Ivonne Escoto – Freelance special-effects artist from Los Angeles, California. She was eliminated in episode four because her hunting trophy character was classified as unfinished by Brian Henson due to the time limit. She returned in episode eight to help Robert take the win.
 Lex Rudd – Puppet and creature costume-maker from Guerneville, California. She was eliminated in episode five because the legs she made for her creature weren't realistic enough in the creature's movement.
 Russ Adams – Special-effects artist and creature creator from Ogden, Utah. He was eliminated in episode six because his swamp creature wasn't camouflaged enough and its paint job didn't belong comfortably. He later returned in episode eight to help Robert take the win.
 Jake Corrick – Student and sculptor from Belle Vernon, Pennsylvania. He was eliminated in episode seven.
 Melissa Doss – Housewife and freelance special-effects artist from Fort Wainwright, Alaska. She is a runner-up in the contest.
 Ben Bayouth – Freelance special-effects artist from Woodland Hills, California. He is a runner-up in the contest.
 Robert Bennett – Sculptor for Walt Disney Imagineering from Orlando, Florida. He is the winner of the contest.

Contestant progress

 The contestant won 'Jim Henson's Creature Shop Challenge'.
 The contestant was a runner-up.
 The contestant won a Challenge.
 The contestant was part of a team that won the Challenge.
 The contestant was in the top in the Challenge.
 The contestant was in the middle in the Challenge.
 The contestant was in the bottom in the Challenge.
 The contestant was in the bottom team in the Challenge.
 The contestant was eliminated.
 The contestant has quit the contest.

Episodes

Episode 1: What Lies Underneath

 Airdate: March 25, 2014
 Creature Brief: Peter Brooke mentors the Creature Designers into building the full-bodied puppet of a never-before-seen sea creature. Alice Dinnean, Nameer El-Kadi, Drew Massey, Misty Rojas, and Michelan Sisti are the featured puppeteers.
 Top Looks: Josh & Lex
 Bottom Looks: Chaz & Robert, Russ & Tina
 Winner: Josh
 Eliminated: Chaz

Episode 2: Return of the Skeksis

 Airdate: April 1, 2014
 Creature Brief: Julie Zobel mentors the Creature Designers while they create a Skeksis from The Dark Crystal that has been banished to a foreign land on the planet Thra and have been called back to the castle. Alice Dinnean, Drew Massey, and Victor Yerrid are the featured puppeteers.
 Top Looks: Robert, Melissa, & Josh and Ben, Jake, & Lex
 Bottom Looks: Russ, Ivonne, Tina
 Winner: Robert
 Eliminated: Tina

Episode 3: Assembly Inspired

 Airdate: April 8, 2014
 Creature Brief: John Criswell mentors the Creature Designers when they create a creature made from the junk that was in Apex Electronics. The creatures in question have been hiding in junk for so long that they have become one with the junk. They are also provided with a cage for the creature to be in where they are trying to escape. Alice Dinnean, Artie Esposito, Sean Johnson, Drew Massey, Michael Oosterom, and Victor Yerrid are the featured puppeteers.
 Top Looks: Ben and Ivonne
 Bottom Looks: Jake and Russ
 Winner: Ben
 Eliminated: Josh (he forfeited the contest)

Episode 4: Heads Up

 Airdate: April 15, 2014
 Creature Brief: Peter Brooke mentors the Creature Designers when they create a fantasy creature that has been slain and returns to life as a hunting trophy mounted on the wall at the Wizard's Mansion. The slain fantasy creature must be made from an animal foam mold which will be given to the Mold Makers to have the molds made for the slain creature. The project must include puppetry with some mechanisms in it which must be performed on the Wizard's Mansion set with the hunting trophy explaining how it ended up in this fate. Donald Faison appears in the episode where he plays the Wizard who interviews each hunting trophy in his possession. Julianne Buescher, Alice Dinnean, Artie Esposito, Drew Massey, Michelan Sisti, Colleen Smith, and Victor Yerrid are the featured puppeteers.
 Top Looks: Ben, Jake, and Robert
 Bottom Looks: Ivonne and Melissa
 Winner: Ben
 Eliminated: Ivonne

Episode 5: Life in Motion

 Airdate: April 22, 2014
 Creature Brief: After the Creature Designers have seen the large-scale Unicorn puppet that was used in one of Lady Gaga's tours, John Criswell mentors the Creature Designers where they create a large-scale believable creature that has real movement while running their ideas with teams' appointed puppeteers. They will also use UV paint to make it glow in the dark as part of a way to bring it to life in the dark. The large-scale creatures will be performed in the black light room. Alice Dinnean, Nameer El-Kadi, and Drew Massey are the featured puppeteers.
 Top Looks: Ben and Melissa
 Bottom Looks: Lex and Jake
 Winner: Melissa
 Eliminated: Lex

Episode 6: Swamp Things

 Airdate: April 29, 2014
 Creature Brief: Upon the Creature Designers seeing the development of the swamp set, Julie Zobel mentors the Creature Creators where they create a swamp creature that can camouflage itself into its surroundings until they reveal themselves to eat some "Scramp Scrats". While the lighting crew and art department finishes up the swamp set, the Creature Designers must also include some mechanism in their creatures. Neville Page appears as a guest judge. Artie Esposito, Sean Johnson, Drew Massey, Michael Oosterom, and Michelan Sisti are the featured puppeteers.
 Top Looks: Melissa, Robert
 Bottom Looks: Ben, Russ
 Winner: Melissa
 Eliminated: Russ

Episode 7: Alien Press Conference

 Airdate: May 6, 2014
 Creature Brief: Gigi brings her Farscape co-star Rygel to the workshop to offer inspiration when the Creature Designers are given the task to build their original alien diplomat (which has a large outer head that has a smaller inner head as its real head as a way of traveling incognito) attending an intergalactic press conference before the Intergalactic Council as they are mentored by Peter Brooke. Barry Sonnenfeld appears as a guest judge. Alice Dinnean, Nameer El-Kadi, Artie Esposito, Sean Johnson, Drew Massey, Michelan Sisti, Allan Trautman, and Victor Yerrid are the featured puppeteers.
 Winner: Ben
 Eliminated: Jake

Episode 8: Tavern at the Crossroads

 Airdate: May 13, 2014
 Creature Brief: After seeing Brian Henson in his office one-by-one, the final three receiving help from the eliminated contestants (sans Josh) as they face their toughest challenge which is to design, build, and perform a full-bodied mystical creature that meets other creatures at a tavern at the mystical crossroads to tell their stories. They also have to make some props associated with their creature and also perform some special effect. Peter Brooke, Julie Zobel, and John Criswell mentors each of the teams. Lisa Henson appears in the audience with the mentors, family members, and members of The Jim Henson Company. Alice Dinnean, Drew Massey, Michael Oosterom, Michelan Sisti, Allan Trautman, and Victor Yerrid are the featured puppeteers.
 Winner: Robert

Reception

Reviews
In a review of the series' premiere episode, Newsday rated it with an A−, saying: "We don't just watch art being made, we come to understand the process." Entertainment Weekly awarded it an "A" rating, calling it "Wildly refreshing…" and saying "...you've never seen a reality show like this." While TV Guide's Matt Roush complained the series often felt like a copy of Face Off, he concluded: "What Creature Shop may lack in originality it makes up for in creative energy. The climactic "Screen Test" reveals are fun to watch, and the critiques are smartly constructive."

Ratings
Upon its premiere on March 25, 2014, Jim Henson's Creature Shop Challenge became Syfy's highest-rated unscripted premiere among Adults 25-54 since July 2013. During the premiere broadcast, the series averaged 1.12 million total viewers, excluding DVR viewing.  Proving especially strong among female demographics, the series was Syfy's highest-rated Tuesday night reality premiere ever among Women 25-54.

References

External links
 Official Website
 

2010s American reality television series
2014 American television series debuts
2014 American television series endings
English-language television shows
Syfy original programming
Television series by The Jim Henson Company
American television shows featuring puppetry